PAL (Phase Alternating Line) is a colour encoding system for analogue television.

PAL or Pal may also refer to:

Businesses and organizations 

 Pal's, an American fast food chain
 Pakistan Academy of Letters, a learned academy in Pakistan
 Parents Action League, an anti-gay organization
 Police Athletic League, an American youth sports league
 Police Athletic League of New York City, a youth organization in New York City
 Polish Academy of Literature (Polska Akademia Literatury)

People 
 Pál, a Hungarian male given name
 Pal (surname)
 Pål Lydersen (born 1965), Norwegian former footballer
 Tamara Pál (born 2000), Hungarian handballer
 Gadaria, Indian shepherd community also known as Pal or Pal Shari
 Signature used by Jean de Paleologu (1855–1942), Romanian poster artist

Places

India
 Pal, Gujarat
 Pal State, a former princely state
 Pal, Jalgaon district, Maharashtra
 Pali, Maharashtra

Elsewhere
 Pal, Andorra
 Pal, Iran

Science and technology 
 Permissive Action Link, a security device for nuclear weapons
 Phenylalanine ammonia-lyase, a class of enzymes
 Physical activity level, a way of expressing a person's daily physical activity
 Progressive addition lenses, eyeglass lenses with a gradient of increasing lens power
 Pyothorax-associated lymphoma, a form of diffuse large B-cell lymphoma associated with chronic inflammation

Computers and programming 
 PAL (programming language)
 PDP-8 Assembly Language, a language used for programming the PDP-8 computer
 Physics Abstraction Layer, a physical simulation computer application programming interface
 PortableApps.com Launcher, in PortableApps.com
 Programmable Array Logic, a type of programmable logic device

Television, film and music 
 Pal (album), by Indian singer KK
 Pal (dog), the first dog to play Lassie in film and television
 Pal the Wonder Dog, of Buster Brown and Our Gang early movie fame
 Pal, a character in the animated TV series Arthur
 PAL, the main antagonist in The Mitchells vs. the Machines

Transportation 
 PAL Airlines, a Canadian airline
 PAL Airlines (Chile), a Santiago-based airline
 PAL Express, the low-cost regional brand of Philippine Airlines
 PAL Indonesia, an Indonesian shipyard company
 Philippine Airlines, the flag carrier of the Republic of the Philippines
 Premier Autmotobiles Limited, a vehicle manufacturer in India
 PAL, the National Rail station code for Palmers Green railway station, London, England

Other uses 
 Pal, another word for friend
 Pal language, spoken in Papua New Guinea
 PAL region, a television publication territory that covers most of Asia, Africa, Europe and South America
 PAL Stadium, San Jose, California
 Pal, a dog food brand from Pedigree Petfoods
 Pals battalion, a type of British World War I army unit
 Middle Persian's ISO 639-2 and 639-3 language code
 Parental Advisory label, a warning label used on music with profanity
 Pilot-Activated Lighting, also called pilot-controlled lighting
 Possession and Acquisition Licence, a Canadian firearms licence
Powered Access Licence permitting operation of a powered personal lifting device

See also 
 Pal Lahara, a town and former princely state in Orissa